Sirtuin (silent mating type information regulation 2 homolog) 5 (S. cerevisiae), also known as SIRT5 is a protein which in humans in encoded by the SIRT5 gene and in other species by the orthologous Sirt5 gene.

This gene encodes a member of the sirtuin family of proteins, homologs to the yeast Sir2 protein. Members of the sirtuin family are characterized by a sirtuin core domain and belong to the class III of the [histone deacetylase] superfamily, and are dependent on NAD+ as co-factor of enzymatic activities. SIRT5 is one of the three sirtuins localized primarily to the mitochondrion.

Structure 
Alternative splicing of this gene results in two transcript variants. The protein structure of SIRT5 has been resolved and shows high degrees of structural conservation with other sirtuins, such as the ancestral yeast protein and human SIRT2.

Function 

SIRT5 has been found to exhibit enzymatic activities as a deacetylase, desuccinylase, and demalonylase, capable of removing acetyl, succinyl, and malonyl groups from the lysine residues of proteins. SIRT5 deacetylases and regulates carbamoyl phosphate synthetase (CPS1), the rate-limiting and initiating step of the urea cycle in liver mitochondria. Deacetylation of CPS1 stimulates its enzymatic activity. Mice with deletion of SIRT5 show elevated ammonia levels after a prolonged fast, whereas in contrast, mice overexpressing SIRT5 show increased CPS1 activity, suggesting one of the functions of SIRT5 may be to regulate the urea cycle. SIRT5 also interacts with and deacetylates cytochrome c. Large-scale profiling studies of SIRT5 deacetylase activity have uncovered over 700 protein substrates, including proteins localized to the mitochondria, the cytosol and other sub cellular localization. The identities of SIRT5 desuccinylation substrates suggest that SIRT5-mediated desuccinylation may be involved in energy metabolism.

The physiological consequences of SIRT5 molecular functions in human is under investigation but may involved regulations of mitochondrial metabolism.

Interactions 
NAD+

Cytochrome c

Carbamoyl phosphate synthetase (CPS1)

References

Further reading